Reinøya is an island in Karlsøy Municipality in Troms og Finnmark county, Norway. The  lies directly east of the large island of Ringvassøya, and the small island of Karlsøya lies to the north of the island. The Ullsfjorden lies along the eastern coast of the island.

The southern part of the island was part of Tromsø Municipality until 1 January 2008 when it was transferred to the municipality of Karlsøy.  The undersea Langsund Tunnel is being built connecting the islands of Reinøya and Ringvassøya. Construction of this tunnel is scheduled to begin in 2019 or 2020.

See also
List of islands of Norway

References

Karlsøy
Islands of Troms og Finnmark